The Nigerian Civil Service consists of employees in Nigerian government agencies other than the military and police. Most employees are career civil servants in the Nigerian ministries, progressing based on qualifications and seniority. Recently the head of the service has been introducing measures to make the ministries more efficient and responsive to the public.

History

The word "civil"" is derived from an old French word "civil", which means "relating to law", and directly from Latin word "civilis", which means "relating to citizen", while the word "service" is derived from an old French word "servise", which means "aids".
The Nigerian Civil Service has its origins in organizations established by the British in colonial times.
Nigeria gained full independence in October 1960 under a constitution that provided for a parliamentary government and a substantial measure of self-government for the country's three regions.
Since then, various panels have studied and made recommendations for reforming of the Civil Service, including the Margan Commission of 1963, the Adebo Commission of 1971 and the Udoji Commission of 1972–74.

A major change occurred with the 1979 adoption of a constitution modeled on that of the United States. The Dotun Philips Panel of 1985 attempted to reform the Civil Service. The 1988 Civil Service Reorganization Decree promulgated by General Ibrahim Babangida had a major impact on the structure and efficiency of the Civil Service.
The later report of the Ayida Panel made recommendations to reverse some of the past innovations and to return to the more efficient Civil Service of earlier years.
The Civil Service has been undergoing gradual and systematic reforms and restructuring since May 29, 1999 after decades of military rule.
However, the civil service is still considered stagnant and inefficient, and the attempts made in the past by panels have had little effect.

In August 2009 the Head of the Civil Service, Stephen Osagiede Oronsaye, proposed reforms where permanent secretaries and directors  would spend a maximum of eight years in office. The reform, approved by President Umaru Yar'Adua, would result in massive retirement of Permanent Secretaries and Directors, many of whom are from the North.
Stephen Oronsaye has said that his goal is for the Nigerian civil service to be among the best organized and managed in the world.
Oronsaye retired in November 2010 at the statutory age of 60 and was succeeded by Oladapo Afolabi.

Budget

A sense of the relative expenditure on the different areas is given by the table below, which shows the 2008 budget for Federal ministries, departments and agencies.

Note: As of January 2008, one Naira was worth about 0.0057 Euros, or 0.0084 US Dollars.

Permanent secretaries
Permanent secretaries head the civil service departments. In August 2009, Stephen Oronsaye announced a major reshuffle where almost half of the permanent secretaries were assigned to new departments.  
A partial list of the new line-up as of December 2009 follows:

Mass sacking of permanent secretaries by president Buhari
On November 10, 2015, President Muhammadu Buhari summoned all the permanent secretaries to the Presidential Villa in Aso Rock and compulsorily retired 17 of them; their retirement in force with immediate effect.

Ministries

Commissions

theophilus erebho, unn, PALG

Internal departments

Unassigned

See also
Federal Ministries of Nigeria
Politics of Nigeria
Civil Service Commission of Nigeria

References

 
Public administration
Federal Ministries of Nigeria